Karamani is a village in the Bitola Municipality of North Macedonia.

Demographics
Karamani is attested in the Ottoman defter of 1467/68 as a village in the vilayet of Manastir. The inhabitants attested bore Slavic and mixed Slavic-Albanian anthroponyms, such as Gjon, son of Božić, Nikola, son of Gjin, Pula (widowed).

According to the 2002 census, the village had a total of 337 inhabitants. Ethnic groups in the village include:

Macedonians 337

References

External links
 Visit Macedonia

Villages in Bitola Municipality